Wyandanch is a station along the Main Line (Ronkonkoma Branch) of the Long Island Rail Road. It is located on Straight Path (Suffolk CR 2) and Long Island Avenue, off Acorn Avenue in Wyandanch, New York. All parking near the station is free, and maintained either by Suffolk County or the Town of Babylon.

History
Wyandanch station was originally built in May 1875 as "West Deer Park". The station and tracks have always been at ground level. During the 1920s and 1930s, the vicinity of the station became the site of numerous horrific accidents involving crashes with trains at the unguarded grade-level rail crossings at Straight Path, 18th Street and Little East Neck Road. In 1935, after repeated protests from the people of Wyandanch, the Public Service Commission (PSC) ordered the LIRR to provide crossing guards at the 18th Street and Straight Path crossings during school hours on school days, so that school children living north of the LIRR to safely walk across the railroad on their way to the schoolhouse at South 20th Street and Straight Path on the south side. 

In December 1948, a model railroading club called the New York Live Steamer Society built a miniature steam railroad ride along the line at Merritt Avenue at North 17th Street, on a plot of land which was owned by the LIRR. No fees were ever charged, and the rides proved to be quite popular. By 1951, three miniature engines were in operation on Sundays and holidays, "two of them steam and the other diesel." The miniature railway moved to Freeport in 1953, when the LIRR needed the land on which the New York Live Steamer Society had been using without charge.

The station was razed in February 1958. The relocated station was built in June 1958 and was similar to the current Bethpage station house.

However, parking at Wyandanch station became problematic in the 1960s with the development of upscale housing in Half Hollow Hills. These upper middle class commuters boarded at Wyandanch since it was closer than the LIRR depot in Huntington Station.

In early 1983, the MTA announced that it was planning to electrify the Main Line from Hicksville to Ronkonkoma. As part of an attempt to speed commuting times through Suffolk County, they wanted to eliminate railroad service in Wyandanch after 108 years. Similar proposals were considered for Pinelawn and Brentwood stations. 
The LIRR believed moving the Deer Park station to Pineaire and eliminating the Wyandanch and Pinelawn stations would allow the faster electric trains to significantly reduce commuting times to Penn Station. The closing of the Wyandanch station would have meant that all LIRR trains would have sped through Wyandanch at speeds of up to 90 mph. This angered and united disparate groups in Wyandanch, prompting civic groups to mobilize residents to protest any termination of railroad service in Wyandanch. Working on a bipartisan basis, Senator Owen Johnson (R-West Babylon) and Assemblyman Patrick Halpin (D-Lindenhurst) convinced the MTA to maintain rail service in Wyandanch as well as Pinelawn. The LIRR agreed to add a fence along the tracks to prevent residents from crossing the tracks and touching the third rail, and built two steel crossover bridges at South 27th Street and at Deer Street, just east of the new station. 

The 1958 station was razed, and in 1987, a new station was built, along with new Ronkonkoma, Central Islip, Brentwood, and Deer Park stations. The new $667,000, unmanned Wyandanch station was erected by Slattery Associates (Farmingdale) on the site of the original 1875 Wyandanch station at Straight Path and Acorn Street. The new station was larger than the 1958 structure it replaced. Of the five stations within the 1987 reconstruction project, Wyandanch station was moved closest to its previous location, specifically the original site of "West Deer Park" station. The LIRR started electric rail service in Wyandanch on January 18, 1988.

On July 13, 2013, the LIRR and state and local elected officials broke ground on "Wyandanch Rising," a 40-acre transit-oriented development project that is to create an intermodal facility at the station, including a parking facility for 900 cars and a new station building; an apartment and retail complex is under construction.  The expanded LIRR station is also intended to support the increased ridership anticipated when LIRR trains begin serving Grand Central station in 2018 (see East Side Access).

As part of the Double Tracking Project completed in 2018, the LIRR constructed two new platforms and installed a snow melt system, a new pedestrian overpass with elevators to provide ADA-compliance, new canopies, new platform shelter, and add platform amenities such as help points and complimentary WiFi. The rebuilt station was designed by Urbahn Architects.

Station layout
This station has two 12-car long side platforms.

Image gallery

References

External links 

Wyandanch Station 2007 Photo (Unofficial LIRR History Website)
Unofficial LIRR Photography Site (lirrpics.com)
Wyandanch Station
 Station from Straight Path from Google Maps Street View
Western end of platforms from Google Maps Street View
 Middle of platforms from Google Maps Street View
Eastern end of platforms from Google Maps Street View
 Inside the Wheelchair-Accessible Overpass from Google Maps Street View

Long Island Rail Road stations in Suffolk County, New York
Railway stations in the United States opened in 1875